Arpani (born 13 June 1994) is an Indonesian professional footballer who plays as a midfielder for Mitra Kukar in the Liga 1.

References

External links
 

1994 births
Living people
People from Kutai Kartanegara Regency
Indonesian footballers
Mitra Kukar players
Association football midfielders
Sportspeople from East Kalimantan